Vlașca County is a former first-order administrative division of the Kingdom of Romania, in southern Muntenia, located between Bucharest and the Danube, which is now mostly the county of Giurgiu. The county seat was Giurgiu.

The county was located in the southern part of Greater Romania, in the southern part of the historical region of Muntenia. The county was bordered on the west by Teleorman County, on the northwest by Argeș County, on the north by Dâmbovița County, on the east by Ilfov County, and to the south by the Kingdom of Bulgaria. Its surface coincides in large part with that of the present Giurgiu County, but there are small parts of it that are included in today's Teleorman County.

Administrative organization

Administratively, until the 1930s, Vlașca County was divided into five districts (plăși):
Plasa Călugăreni, headquartered at Călugăreni
Plasa Câlniștea, headquartered at Drăgănești-Vlașca
Plasa Dunărea, headquartered at Giurgiu
Plasa Glavacioc, headquartered at Glavacioc
Plasa Neajlov, headquartered initially at Neajlovu, and later at Corbii Mari.

In 1938, the county was divided into seven districts:
Plasa Călugăreni, headquartered at Călugăreni
Plasa Câlniștea, headquartered at Drăgănești-Vlașca
Plasa Dunărea, headquartered at Giurgiu
Plasa Ghimpați, headquartered at Ghimpați
Plasa Glavacioc, headquartered at Glavacioc
Plasa Neajlov, headquartered initially at Neajlovu, and later at Corbii Mari.
Plasa Siliștea, headquartered at Siliștea Gumești

After 1938
In 1938, the county was disestablished and incorporated into the newly-formed Ținutul Argeș, but it was re-established in 1940 after the fall of Carol II's regime - only to be abolished 10 years later by the Communist regime.

Population 
According to the 1930 census data, the county population was 296,412 inhabitants, ethnically divided as follows: 97.1% Romanians, 2.2% Romanies, 0.2% Hungarians, as well as other minorities. From the religious point of view, the population was 99.4% Eastern Orthodox, 0.2% Roman Catholic, 0.1% Adventist, as well as other minorities.

Urban population 
In 1930, the county's urban population was 31,016 inhabitants, comprising 92.7% Romanians, 2.4% Romanies, 1.0% Hungarians, 0.7% Jews, as well as other minorities. From the religious point of view, the urban population was composed of 96.4% Eastern Orthodox, 1.3% Roman Catholic, 0.8% Jewish, as well as other minorities.

References

External links

  Vlașca County on memoria.ro

Former counties of Romania
Wallachia
1879 establishments in Romania
1938 disestablishments in Romania
1940 establishments in Romania
1950 disestablishments in Romania
States and territories established in 1879
States and territories disestablished in 1938
States and territories established in 1940
States and territories disestablished in 1950